20 Years of Stony Plain is a compilation album, released in 1996 on Stony Plain Records to mark the label's 20th anniversary. It features tracks by many of the artists who have released material on the label.

Track listing

Disc One

Disc Two

References

Record label compilation albums
1996 compilation albums
Country music compilation albums
Stony Plain Records compilation albums
Compilation albums by Canadian artists